Susanne Losch (born 12 February 1966) is a German hurdler. She competed in the women's 400 metres hurdles at the 1988 Summer Olympics.

References

External links
 

1966 births
Living people
Athletes (track and field) at the 1988 Summer Olympics
German female hurdlers
Olympic athletes of East Germany
Place of birth missing (living people)